Drunk on the Pope's Blood/The Agony Is the Ecstacy is a split compilation EP by the post-punk acts The Birthday Party and Lydia Lunch, released on February 18, 1982, through 4AD. It contains live material from a show performed on November 26, 1981, at The Venue in London. Three of the four Birthday Party tracks were included on their Live 1981-82 CD. Their version of the song "Loose" and the Lydia Lunch piece have never been officially reissued on CD. The Lydia Lunch side is a single track recorded up to the run-out groove, causing the song to play endlessly on manual turntables.

Track listing

Personnel 
Side one
Phill Calvert – drums
Nick Cave – vocals
Mick Harvey – guitar
Rowland S. Howard – guitar
Tracy Pew – bass guitar

Side two
Kristian Hoffman – drums
Lydia Lunch – vocals
Murray Mitchell – guitar
Steven Severin – guitar

Charts

References

External links 
 

1982 EPs
The Birthday Party (band) albums
Lydia Lunch albums
4AD EPs
Split EPs